All These Small Moments is a 2018 American coming-of-age drama film written and directed by Melissa Miller Costanzo. The film stars Molly Ringwald, Brian d'Arcy James, Brendan Meyer, Sam McCarthy, Harley Quinn Smith and Jemima Kirke. The film was released on January 17, 2019, by Orion Classics.

Cast  
Molly Ringwald as Carla Sheffield
Brian d'Arcy James as Tom Sheffield
Brendan Meyer as Howie Sheffield
Sam McCarthy as Simon Sheffield
Harley Quinn Smith as Lindsay
Jemima Kirke as Odessa
Roscoe Orman as Dr. Rogers
David Joseph Craig as Customer
Salena Qureshi as Katie
Spenser Granese as Odessa's Husband
Derek Michalak as Sebastian
Jazzy Williams as Becca
Margot Steinberg as Felicity Kavanagh
Elijah Boothe as Carter
Connor Johnston as Kevin
Charlie Oh as Harry
Evan Dominguez as Eduardo

Release
The film premiered at the Tribeca Film Festival on April 24, 2018. On October 18, 2018, Orion Classics acquired distribution rights to the film. The film was released on January 17, 2019, by Orion Classics.

Reception

References

External links
 

2018 films
2010s English-language films
American drama films
Orion Pictures films
2018 drama films
2010s American films